Kenneth Hasan "Kenny" Saief (born ) is an American professional soccer player who plays as a left midfielder for Azerbaijan Premier League club Neftçi and the United States national team. He played for Israel internationally at both youth and senior levels, before switching allegiance.

Early life
Saief was born in Panama City, Florida, U.S., to Druze-Israeli parents; The family returned to Israel when he was three.

Club career
Saief began his professional career with Bnei Sakhnin in 2011, before he was transferred to Hapoel Haifa one season later. The next year, he moved to Hapoel Ironi Kiryat Shmona and reached the final of the Israel State Cup. Saief made only two appearances however, which resulted in a transfer to Ironi Nir Ramat HaSharon. There he gained more playing opportunities.

Saief attracted the attention of Belgian Pro League team K.A.A. Gent, who signed him for a three-year deal on August 8, 2014. On May 22, 2018, Saief officially signed to Anderlecht.

On March 6, 2019, Saief was loaned to FC Cincinnati of Major League Soccer. On March 24, 2019, Saief scored his first MLS goal against the New England Revolution. On June 11, 2019, Saief's loan was terminated due to injury complications.

On February 12, 2020  he was loaned to Polish Ekstraklasa's Lechia Gdańsk until the end of 2019–20 season.

International career
Saief has represented the Israel national team at various youth levels. He reportedly stated that he expected to play for the United States national team, although he was called up to the Israel national team and made his debut in a friendly 2–1 loss to Croatia.

On June 3, 2017, Saief was called up by the United States as part of their 40-man preliminary roster for the 2017 CONCACAF Gold Cup. As part of his callup, Saief filed a one-time switch with FIFA, tying him permanently to the US program.

On June 22, 2017, U.S. Soccer confirmed that Saief had been approved by FIFA for a change of association.

He was chosen to make his first start for the United States against Paraguay on March 27, 2018.

Career statistics

Honors
Gent
Belgian Pro League: 2014–15
Belgian Super Cup: 2015

See also
Sports in Israel

References

External links

1993 births
Living people
People from Panama City, Florida
Association football midfielders
American soccer players
Soccer players from Florida
United States men's international soccer players
Israel under-21 international footballers
Israel international footballers
American people of Israeli descent
American Druze
People with acquired Israeli citizenship
Arab citizens of Israel
Israeli Druze
Arab-Israeli footballers
Druze sportspeople
Maccabi Haifa F.C. players
Hapoel Haifa F.C. players
Maccabi Netanya F.C. players
Beitar Nes Tubruk F.C. players
TSV 1860 Munich players
Bnei Sakhnin F.C. players
Hapoel Ironi Kiryat Shmona F.C. players
Hapoel Nir Ramat HaSharon F.C. players
K.A.A. Gent players
R.S.C. Anderlecht players
FC Cincinnati players
Lechia Gdańsk players
F.C. Ashdod players
Neftçi PFK players
Israeli Premier League players
Belgian Pro League players
Major League Soccer players
Azerbaijan Premier League players
Israeli expatriate footballers
American expatriate soccer players
Expatriate footballers in Belgium
Expatriate footballers in Poland
Expatriate footballers in Azerbaijan
Israeli expatriate sportspeople  in Belgium
Israeli expatriate sportspeople in Germany
Israeli expatriate sportspeople in Poland
Israeli expatriate sportspeople in Azerbaijan
American expatriate sportspeople in Belgium
American expatriate soccer players in Germany
American expatriate sportspeople in Poland
American expatriate sportspeople in Azerbaijan
Dual internationalists (football)